Rinflajš is a Serbian dish traditionally made in the province of Vojvodina. The name rinflajš is borrowed from German word Rindfleisch (meaning Beef).

The meal is usually made for Sunday lunches. A whole beef brisket, which has been slowly simmered in a broth with carrots, bell peppers, parsnip, onions, parsley and cauliflower is usually served with a side of vegetables from the broth as well as mashed potatoes covered in a tomato sauce made from slowly simmered flour, tomato juice, paprika and sugar.

See also
 Serbian cuisine

References

National dishes
Serbian cuisine